Glyptodonts are an extinct subfamily of large, heavily armoured armadillos. They arose in South America around 48 million years ago and spread to southern North America after the continents became connected around 2.7 million years ago. The best-known genus within the group is Glyptodon. They became extinct approximately 11,000 years ago at the end of the Pleistocene, following the arrival of humans to the Americas.

While they were formerly considered to constitute the distinct family Glyptodontidae, in 2016, an analysis of Doedicurus Mitochondrial DNA (also known as mtDNA / mDNA) found that it was, in fact, nested within the modern armadillos as the sister group of a clade consisting of Chlamyphorinae and Tolypeutinae. For this reason, glyptodonts and all armadillos but Dasypus were relocated to a new family, Chlamyphoridae, and glyptodonts were demoted from the former family Glyptodontidae to a subfamily.

Evolution 
Glyptodonts first evolved during the Eocene in South America, which remained their center of species diversity. For example, an Early Miocene glyptodont with many primitive features, when compared to other species, Parapropalaehoplophorus septentrionalis, was discovered at a now-elevated site in Chile and described in 2007. After the Isthmus of Panama formed about three million years ago, the genus Glyptotherium spread north as part of the Great American Interchange, as did pampatheres, armadillos and a number of other types of xenarthrans (e.g., ground sloths).

Description 

Glyptodonts possessed a tortoise-like body armour, made of bony deposits in their skin called osteoderms or scutes. Each species of glyptodont had a unique osteoderm pattern and shell type. With this protection, they were armored like turtles; glyptodonts could not withdraw their heads, but their armoured skin formed a bony cap on the top of their skull. Glyptodont tails had a ring of bones for protection. Doedicurus possessed a large mace-like spiked tail that it would have used to defend itself against predators and, possibly, other Doedicurus. Glyptodonts had the advantage of large size. Many, such as the type genus, Glyptodon, were the size of modern automobiles. The presence of such heavy defenses suggests they were prey of a large, effective predator. At the time that glyptodonts evolved, the apex predators in the island continent of South America were phorusrhacids, a family of giant flightless carnivorous birds.

In physical appearance, glyptodonts superficially resembled the much earlier dinosaurian ankylosaurs and, to a lesser degree, the recently extinct giant meiolaniid turtles of Australia. These are examples of the convergent evolution of unrelated lineages into similar forms. The largest glyptodonts could weigh up to 2,000 kilograms. Like most of the megafauna in the Americas, they all became extinct at the end of the last ice age 10,000 years ago.

Behaviour 

Glyptodonts were grazing herbivores. Like many other xenarthrans, they had no incisor or canine teeth, but had a number of cheek teeth that would have been able to grind up tough vegetation, such as grasses. They also had distinctively deep jaws, with large downward bony projections that would have anchored their powerful chewing muscles.

Extinction 
Glyptodonts became extinct at the end of the last ice age along with a large number of other megafaunal species, including pampatheres, the giant ground sloths, and Macrauchenia. Their much smaller, more lightly armored and flexible armadillo relatives survived. The extinction of the glyptodonts coincided with the arrival of early humans in the Americas. Archeological evidence suggests that these humans made use of the animals' armored shells, however, other causes cannot be ruled out.

References

External links 

 Glyptodont article at ScienceBlogs, with photos
 

Cingulates
Prehistoric cingulates
 
 
 
 
 
Lutetian first appearances
Holocene extinctions
Neogene mammals of South America
Pleistocene mammals of South America
Pleistocene mammals of North America
Taxa named by Hermann Burmeister